Azygia is a genus of flatworms belonging to the family Azygiidae.

The species of this genus are found in Europe, Southeastern Asia and Northern America.

Species:

 Azygia acuminata Goldberger, 1911
 Azygia anguillae Ozaki, 1924
 Azygia angusticauda (Stafford, 1904) Manter, 1926
 Azygia aphredoderi Barger, 2014
 Azygia armati Tiwari, 1959
 Azygia asiatica Simha & Pershad, 1964
 Azygia cyprinus Wang
 Azygia gotoi (Ariake, 1922) Ozaki, 1924
 Azygia hwangtsiyui Tsin, 1933
 Azygia hwangtsiyusi Tsin & Tsin, 1933
 Azygia indicusi Lokhande, 1991
 Azygia longa (Leidy, 1851) Manter, 1926
 Azygia lucii (Müller, 1776) Lühe, 1909
 Azygia marulii Jaiswal & Narayan, 1971
 Azygia micropteri (MacCallum, 1921) Skrjabin & Guschanskaja, 1958
 Azygia mirabilis (Braun, 1891) Odening, 1978
 Azygia papillata Ubgade & Agarwal, 1979
 Azygia parasiluri Wang, 1983
 Azygia perryi Fujita, 1918
 Azygia pristipomai Tubangui, 1928
 Azygia rhinogobii Shimazu, 2007
 Azygia robusta Odhner, 1911
 Azygia sangangensis Wang, 1981
 Azygia sinipercae Wang & Pang, 1973
 Azygia stunkardi Rai, 1962
 Azygia tereticollis (Müller, 1776) Lühe, 1909

References

Platyhelminthes